Gleb Yakushevich (born 31 July 2002) is a Belarusian footballer who plays for Minsk.

References

External links

2002 births
Living people
Belarusian footballers
Association football defenders
FC Minsk players
Belarusian Premier League players